Lonya Chico is a district of the province of Luya. Lonya Chico offers several attractive places for tourists such as ruins of the Chachapoya culture. Also he emphasizes the big variety of fruits that grows in the zone.

The capital of the district, Lonya Chico, celebrates the day of its patron saint, Saint Lucy, on August 15.  Typical local foods include chocho, purtumute, and guinea pig with potatoes among others.

In the north the District of Lonya Chico borders the District of Luya and the District of Luya Viejo, in the east the District of Chachapoyas, in the south the District of Inguilpata and in the west with the District of Conila.

Districts of the Luya Province
Districts of the Amazonas Region